"L'Edera" is an Italian language song, written by Saverio Seracini and Vincenzo D'Acquisto. The song premiered at the 8th Sanremo Music Festival in January 1958, being performed first by Nilla Pizzi and then Tonina Torrielli, with separate performances, and placing second in the competition, behind "Nel blu dipinto di blu" by Domenico Modugno and Johnny Dorelli.
"L'Edera" was later recorded by several Italian artists, including Claudio Villa.

"Constantly (L'Edera)"
In 1964, the song was revived by Cliff Richard in an English language song with music based on "L'Edera". The single, a non-album release officially titled "Constantly (L'Edera)" is more commonly known as just "Constantly". The music is still credited to Saverio Seracini, who composed the music for "L'Edera". The new English lyrics to the song were written by Michael Julien. The recording was arranged and conducted by Norrie Paramor.

The British single reached No.  4 in the UK Singles Chart and was an international hit charting in Australia (No. 6), Ireland (No. 8), New Zealand (No. 3), Norway (No. 4) and Sweden (No. 10).

"True True Lovin'"
In some markets, "Constantly" appeared as a B-side to another Cliff Richard single "True True Lovin'". In Hong Kong, this configuration reached at least number 6.

Chart performance

See also
Cliff Richard discography

References

Cliff Richard songs
1958 songs
Songs written by Michael Julien
Columbia Graphophone Company singles
1964 singles
Sanremo Music Festival songs